This article lists important figures and events in Malaysian public affairs during the year 1992, together with births and deaths of notable Malaysians.

Incumbent political figures

Federal level
Yang di-Pertuan Agong: Sultan Azlan Shah
Raja Permaisuri Agong: Tuanku Bainun
Prime Minister: Dato' Sri Dr Mahathir Mohamad
Deputy Prime Minister: Dato' Ghafar Baba
Lord President: Abdul Hamid Omar

State level
 Sultan of Johor: Sultan Iskandar
 Sultan of Kedah: Sultan Abdul Halim Muadzam Shah
 Sultan of Kelantan: Sultan Ismail Petra
 Raja of Perlis: Tuanku Syed Putra
 Sultan of Perak: Raja Nazrin Shah (Regent)
 Sultan of Pahang: Sultan Ahmad Shah
 Sultan of Selangor: Sultan Salahuddin Abdul Aziz Shah
 Sultan of Terengganu: Sultan Mahmud Al-Muktafi Billah Shah
 Yang di-Pertuan Besar of Negeri Sembilan: Tuanku Jaafar (Deputy Yang di-Pertuan Agong)
 Yang di-Pertua Negeri (Governor) of Penang: Tun Dr Hamdan Sheikh Tahir
 Yang di-Pertua Negeri (Governor) of Malacca: Tun Syed Ahmad Al-Haj bin Syed Mahmud Shahabuddin
 Yang di-Pertua Negeri (Governor) of Sarawak: Tun Ahmad Zaidi Adruce Mohammed Noor
 Yang di-Pertua Negeri (Governor) of Sabah: Tun Said Keruak

Events 
 1 January – The Selangor Pewter Sdn Bhd company changes its name to Royal Selangor.
 1 January – Jabatan Perkhidmatan Pos Malaysia is incorporated as Pos Malaysia Berhad.
 22 February – Sudirman Arshad, popular singer and Asian No.1 Singer dies age 39 at his sister's house in Bangsar, Kuala Lumpur. His body is brought back to his hometown in Temerloh, Pahang and laid to rest at Chengal Muslim Cemetery.
 16 March – The former Kuala Lumpur City Hall building in Jalan Raja, Kuala Lumpur is destroyed by fire.
 17–19 April – 1992 Malaysian motorcycle Grand Prix
 26 April–16 May – Rothmans 1992 Thomas & Uber Cup
 16 May – Malaysia's men's badminton team wins the fifth Thomas Cup at Stadium Negara, Kuala Lumpur, beating Indonesia with the aggregate of 3–2.
 17 May – The new slogan Malaysia Boleh is introduced.
 20 June – 13 die in a tanker blast and 24-hour blaze at Port Klang, Selangor. 
 25 July–9 August – Malaysia competes at the 1992 Summer Olympics in Barcelona, Spain. In badminton, men's doubles players Razif Sidek and Jalani Sidek won their first ever Olympic medal at these Games.
 15 August – Proton Saga Iswara launches.
 August – Kuala Lumpur is chosen as the host of the 1998 Commonwealth Games. It is the first time in history that a city in Asia has been chosen to host the Commonwealth Games. 
 23 August – The last horse race at the old Selangor Turf Club, Kuala Lumpur before the club moves to its new location at Sungai Besi.
 29 September – The 1992 Peninsular Malaysia electricity blackout crisis.
 September – The groundbreaking ceremony for the National Sports Complex in Bukit Jalil.
15 October – A fire at the Subang Airport breaks out, six months after a major blaze had destroyed the South Wing of Terminal One in April.
30 November – Sultan Iskandar of Johor assaults Douglas Gomez, a hockey coach, leading to a media frenzy and the subsequent 1993 amendments to the Constitution of Malaysia.

Births
 January 2 – Fadlan Hazim – Actor
 March 17 – Ayda Jebat – Singer and actress
March 27 – Emma Maembong – Actress
June 21 – Mohd Ferris Danial – Footballer
June 24 – Syafiq Kyle – Actor and model
June 28 – Elizabeth Jimie – Diver
Julai 17 – Mikail Andre – Actor
August 28 – Ahmad Amsyar Azman – Diver
September 27 – Izara Aishah – Actress
November 4 – D. Saarvindran – Footballer 
November 12 – Lia Natalia – Actress and model
November 13 – Jazeman Jaafar – Malaysian Formula BMW driver
December 6 – Syed Saddiq, Malaysian politician and activist
December 7 – Syafiq Yusof – Director and actor

Deaths
22 February – Sudirman Arshad — Popular Malay singer and Asian No.1 Singer
9 March – Kamaluddin Muhamad (Keris Mas) – Malay author
18 April – Tan Sri Abdul Kadir Yusof – Minister of Law and Judiciary, Attorney-General and Solicitor-General
20 April – A. Rahim – Actor
15 May – Noorizan Mohd Noor — Actress
6 August – Siti Tanjung Perak – Actress
28 August – Tan Sri Mohd Asri Muda – Former Menteri Besar of Kelantan

See also
 1992
 1991 in Malaysia | 1993 in Malaysia
 History of Malaysia

 
Malaysia
Years of the 20th century in Malaysia
Malaysia
1990s in Malaysia